Events in the year 2020 in Bolivia.

Incumbents 

 President: Jeanine Áñez (Interim president) (until 8 November), Luis Arce (from 8 November)
 Vice President: (Vacant, See 2019 Bolivian political crisis), David Choquehuanca (from 8 November)

Events 

10 March – Bolivia reports its first COVID-19 cases, of two individuals in the departments of Oruro and Santa Cruz.
12 March – All public school sessions are suspended in Bolivia until 31 March, as well as all commercial flights to and from Europe indefinitely. Large-scale public gatherings of more than 1,000 people are also prohibited by the government.
18 October – General elections are held. Luis Arce (MAS-IPSP) wins an outright majority of 55.1%, eliminating the necessity of a runoff vote.
8 November – Luis Arce is inaugurated as the 67th President of Bolivia.

Deaths
26 January – Alfredo Da Silva, 89, Bolivian-American artist (road accident)
2 September – Abdúl Aramayo, 86, international footballer

References 

 
2020s in Bolivia
Years of the 21st century in Bolivia
Bolivia
Bolivia